Kelly Butte is a  summit located in the southeast corner of King County in Washington state. It is set on land managed by Mount Baker-Snoqualmie National Forest. Precipitation runoff from Kelly Butte drains into tributaries of the Green River. Access is via the 1.7-mile Kelly Butte Trail which leads to a restored, historical fire lookout tower originally constructed in 1926 and occupies the summit. Flora along the trail includes lilies, bear grass, Indian paintbrush, penstemon, arnica, columbine, lupine, phlox, and huckleberry. This geographical feature's name has been officially adopted by the U.S. Board on Geographic Names.

Climate
Kelly Butte is located in the marine west coast climate zone of western North America. Most weather fronts originate in the Pacific Ocean, and travel east toward the Cascade Mountains. As fronts approach, they are forced upward by the peaks of the Cascade Range (Orographic lift), causing them to drop their moisture in the form of rain or snowfall onto the Cascades. As a result, the west side of the Cascades experiences high precipitation, especially during the winter months in the form of snowfall. During winter months, weather is usually cloudy, but due to high pressure systems over the Pacific Ocean that intensify during summer months, there is often little or no cloud cover during the summer. The months July through October offer the most favorable weather for climbing this mountain.

Gallery

See also

 Geology of the Pacific Northwest

References

External links

 Weather forecast: Kelly Butte
 Kelly Butte Trail 1031: US Forest Service
 National Historic Lookout Register: Kelly Butte Lookout

Cascade Range
Mountains of King County, Washington
Mountains of Washington (state)
North American 1000 m summits
Mount Baker-Snoqualmie National Forest